Salima is a township in the Central Region of Malawi and the capital of the Salima District.

Transport 

The city has a railway station on the Sena railway, under concession of Central East African Railways.

Taxi bicycles are the most common mode of transport in the district which in the local language they are called "Dampa/kabaza".

Climate

Demographics

References

Populated places in Central Region, Malawi